Terete is a term in botany used to describe a cross section that is circular, or like a distorted circle, with a single surface wrapping around it. This is usually contrasted with cross-sections that are flattened, with a distinct upper surface that is different from the lower surface. The cross-section of a branch in a tree is somewhat round, so the branch is terete. The cross section of a normal leaf has an upper surface, and a lower surface, so the leaf is not terete. However, the fleshy leaves of succulents are sometimes terete. Fruticose lichens are terete, with a roughly circular cross section and a single wrap-around skin-like surface called the cortex, compared to foliose lichens and crustose lichens, which have a flattened cross section with an upper surface that is distinct from the lower surface.

Plants and lichens may also be described as subterete, meaning that they are not completely terete.

References

Plant morphology